Kamyabi was a 1984 Pakistani, family drama and a musical film – directed,  screenplay, produced by Pervez Malik. Film starring actor Shabnam, Nadeem, Sabiha Khanum, Talat Hussain.

Cast
 Nadeem as (Tariq), the film's title role
 Shabnam
 Talat Hussain
 Sabiha Khanum
 Master Khurram
 Nannha
 Anis Qureshi
 Ejaz Akhtar

Soundtrack
The lyrics are penned by Masroor Anwar and the film musical score by M. Ashraf:

Track listing

Box office
The film was a golden jubilee hit, completing 61 weeks in the theaters.

References

External links
 
 

1984 films
1980s musical drama films
Pakistani drama films
1980s Urdu-language films
Urdu-language Pakistani films
1984 drama films
Films scored by M Ashraf